The Tasman Island Lighthouse is on Tasman Island off the coast of southeastern Tasmania, Australia. It was one of the most isolated lighthouses in Australia. It was first lit on 2 April 1906, automated in 1976 and demanned in 1977. Solar conversion occurred in 1991. Various light sources have been fitted to the lighthouse since low voltage solar was installed in 1991. The current light source is a Vega VRB25. It has a character of Flashing 7.5x - Flash 0.1s - Eclipse 7.4s and produces 63,000 candelas with a geographical range of 39 nautical miles and a nominal range of 18 nautical miles.

At a special meeting of the Hobart Marine Board on 6 April 1904, it was announced that a lighthouse was to be built on Tasman Island.

The successful tenderer was Henrikson & Knutson for a price of £10,487 10s with an undertaking to complete the works in 18 months from the date of announcement being 18 August 1904. This company had previously built the Denison Canal near Dunalley.

The components of the cast iron lighthouse were prefabricated in England and hauled piece by piece up the 250-metre-high cliffs before assembly. The island is now part of the Tasman National Park. The lighthouse and associated structures, such as the keepers’ cottages, are listed on Australia's Register of the National Estate. The original first-order Fresnel lens by Chance Brothers can be seen on display at the Australian National Maritime Museum in Sydney, the original lantern is on loan to the Friends of Tasman Island and currently in storage in Hobart.
Either annually or biennially the lighthouse and island are open for public access via helicopter tours. These trips are organised by the Rotary Club of the Tasman Peninsula.

Tasman Island lighthouse and surrounding land is owned by the Tasmanian State government. The Australian Maritime Safety Authority (AMSA) lease the lighthouse and land from the Tasmania Parks & Wildlife Service. The AMSA lease consists of one parcel of land totaling 2456m2. Within this lease are the lighthouse, solar array and helipad.
The current lease was signed on 1 May 1998 for a period of 25 years. This lease has an option for extension for a further 25 years.

See also

 History of Tasmania
 List of lighthouses in Tasmania

References

External links

 Australian Maritime Safety Authority

Lighthouses completed in 1906
Lighthouses in Tasmania
1906 establishments in Australia
Commonwealth Heritage List places in Tasmania
Tasmanian Heritage Register
Heritage-listed lighthouses in Australia